Lo de Antes is Hector & Tito's first compilation album. It was released on April 5, 2002 under the label of Black Jack. This album contains tracks from their previous albums and albums from producers or DJs of the Reggaeton genre.

Track list

References

Héctor & Tito albums
2002 albums